Jumblies Theatre, located in Toronto, Canada is a non-profit organization aimed at expanding arts to everyone.

Origins

Jumblies Theatre was founded in 2001 by Artistic Director, Ruth Howard. Howard's work is inspired by various artistic traditions, including the British Community Play form, pioneered by the Colway Theatre Trust, and brought to Canada in the 1990s by Dale Hamilton.

Practice

Jumblies has four main categories;  Jumblies Projects, Jumblies Studio, Jumblies Offshoots and Jumblies At Large. 

Jumblies Projects involve neighborhoods and communities over a multitude of years as artists create pieces based on research and collaboration. Jumblies Studio is for learning, mentorship and professional growth. Jumblies Offshoots, maintaining collaborative and supportive relationships with communities, artists, and past projects; Jumblies At Large, forming partnerships to infiltrate community arts practice into the cultural mainstream.

Jumblies Projects are typically residencies, which involve hundreds of community participants and dozens of  professional artists from a range of disciplines and cultural traditions. Toronto residency neighbourhoods to date include South Riverdale, Lawrence Heights, Davenport-Perth and Central Etobicoke, Scarborough.

The Jumblies Studio has several components, including mentorship, consultancy, seminars and symposia, print and digital resources and Artfare Essentials, an intensive week-long course on the principles and practices of art that engages with and creates community. Versions of Artfare Essentials and other related workshops have been delivered in Toronto and across Ontario and Canada with many partners. Jumblies has mentored many organizations and artists; welcomed many paid interns/apprentices; published two collection of essays (Out of Place); and supported and incubated new projects.

Former Jumblies interns have gone on to establish independent Offshoot organizations as legacies of Jumblies' former residencies in the Davenport West area of Toronto (Arts4All), Central Etobicoke (MABELLEarts), Scarborough (The Community Arts Guild), as well as other community arts projects and organizations in Toronto and Ontario, including Making Room (Parkdale, Toronto), Aanmitaagzi  (Nipissing First Nation), Thinking Rock (Algoma Region, Ontario), and Edge of the Woods Theatre (Huntsville).

Projects

South Riverdale (2001) Project Partners: South Riverdale Community Health Centre, WoodGreen Community Centre, Ralph Thornton Centre, Jimmie Simpson Recreation Centre and Park, Queen Street East Presbyterian Church, Riverdale Community Business Centre, WoodGreen United Church

Arts4All (2001-2004)  Offshoot project (2004–present) Project Partners: Davenport Perth Neighbourhood Centre, the STOP Community Food Centre, Pelham Park (TCHC), Davenport Perth United Church

Camp Naivelt (2006-2009) Project Partners: United Jewish Peoples Order, Morris Winchevsky Centre, Mayworks Festival

Jumblies Studio (2007–present) Program Partners: Davenport Perth Neighbourhood Centre, Ontario Trillium Foundation, George Cedric Metcalf Charitable Foundation, The J. W. McConnell Family Foundation
Launched in 2007 as a training and mentorship program. Through the program, artists participate in workshops, learning sessions and apprenticeship opportunities in community arts.

The Community Arts Guild (2008-2012) Offshoot project (2012–present) Project Partners: Cedar Ridge Studio Gallery, East Scarborough Storefront, Toronto Community Housing Corporation, Ontario Trillium Foundation,

Touching Ground: Project Partners: [First Story Toronto; Toronto Community Living; Railway Lands Residents Association; Toronto Community Housing Corporation, Continuum Contemporary Music, Evergreen Brick Works, Historic Fort York

Productions

 Twisted Metal and Mermaids Tears (2000)
 I’m Taipingi Too! (2001)
 More or the Magic Fish (2002)
 The Land of Three Doors (2003)
 Once A Shoreline (2004)
 Your Name is Written in the Sky (2005)
 Where I’m From (2005)
 Tea and Bridges (2006)
 Bridge of One Hair (2007)
 Hawa Jabril Book Launch (2007)
 Pidgeon Creek Pageant (2008)
 Oy Di Velt Vet Vern Yinger (2008-9)
 Nesting (2009)
 Family Suite (2010)
 Like An Old Tale (2011)
 Train of Thought Tour (2015)
 Touching Ground Festival (2017)
 Four Lands Tour (2016–18)
 Talking Treaties Spectacle (2017–18)
 Odaabanaag (2019)

Further reading

 Jumblies Poem by Edward Lear
 Easy to Say: Reflections on the roles of art and the artist in Canadian adaptations of the Colway Community Play form funded by Canada Council for the Arts,  Rachael Van Fossen and Ruth Howard, Jan 2005
 Produced short video on Once A Shoreline process as part of Documenting Engagement Vancouver,  Ruth Howard Jan. 2004
 The Cultural Equivalent of Daycare?,  Ruth Howard, funded by In Print Dialogue, Community Arts Ontario, 2004
 The Aesthetics of Including Everyone, Ruth Howard,  Alt Theatre, Fall 2002.
 "Is Anyone Political Any More?", Canadian Theatre Review, Edited by Kim Renders, Julie Salverson and Jenn Stephenson, Fall 2011.
 "Out of the Tunnel There Came Tea", Chapter in VIVA! Community Arts and Popular Education in the Americas, SUNY Press and Between the Lines, edited by Deb Barndt, 2011
 "Placemats for September 11th", Critical Perspectives on Canadian Theatre in English, Vol.17: Political Popular Theatre, Ruth Howard, Ed. Julie Salverson, General Editor Ric Knowles, Playwrights Canada Press, 2010.
 "Easy to Say", Ruth Howard and Rachael Van Fossen,  Off-The-Radar, web publication by the Canada Council for the Arts Interarts Section, 2005.
 "Holding On and Letting Go", Ruth Howard, Canadian Theatre Review, 1997.

See also
Community art
Community theatre
Ruth Howard
Ann Jellicoe - Founder of The Colway Trust

References

External links
 

Theatre companies in Toronto
Community theatre